The Blackzilians was a professional team of fighters in mixed martial arts, boxing, kickboxing, amateur wrestling and catch wrestling located in South Florida. The team had included former UFC champions Rashad Evans, Vitor Belfort, Eddie Alvarez and Kamaru Usman.

History
Owned by Glenn Robinson, Blackzilians, started when MMA fighters Jorge Santiago, Danillo Villefort, Yuri Villefort, and Gesias Cavalcante left American Top Team. The name 'Blackzilians' was coined when Strikeforce Middleweight Danillo Villefort was looking through their management's website and pointed out to Robinson that every fighter (at the time) was Black or Brazilian.

It was reported on September 20, 2018, that Glenn Robinson, Blackzilians founder, had died of a suspected heart attack.

As of 2017, the Blackzilians as a gym is considered defunct. Many of its members have left to join Sanford MMA, now Kill Cliff Fight Club (founded by Blackzilians trainers Henry Hooft and Greg Jones) which is considered a successor to the Blackzilians.

Instructors
Henri Hooft, head and striking coach
Greg Jones, Wrestling coach
Neil Melanson, head grappling coach. His style is heavily influenced by the Hayastan school which mixes Catch as catch can wrestling with Judo and Sambo.
Jorge Santiago, Brazilian Jiu-Jitsu coach

Notable fighters

Boxing
 Guillermo Rigondeaux (WBA, WBO, Summer Olympics)
 Idel Torriente (Summer Olympics)
Kickboxing
 Cosmo Alexandre (ONE FC, Bellator, K-1, It's Showtime)
 Randy Blake (Glory, K-1)
 Daniel Ghiță (Glory, It's Showtime, SUPERKOMBAT, K-1)
 Murthel Groenhart (Glory, It's Showtime, K-1)
 Robin van Roosmalen (Glory, It's Showtime, K-1)
 Gökhan Saki (Glory, It's Showtime, K-1)(UFC]
 Paul Slowinski (SUPERKOMBAT, K-1)
 Andrei Stoica (Glory, SUPERKOMBAT, K-1)
 Tyrone Spong (WSOF, Glory, It's Showtime, K-1)
 Rico Verhoeven (Glory, It's Showtime, SUPERKOMBAT, K-1)
Mixed martial arts
 Rashad Evans (UFC)
 Anthony Johnson (UFC, WSOF)
 Thiago Silva (UFC, WSOF)
 Vitor Belfort (UFC, Affliction, Pride FC)
 Cezar Ferreira (UFC)
 Eddie Alvarez (ONE FC, UFC, Bellator) 
 Matt Mitrione (Bellator, UFC)
 Michael Johnson (UFC)

 Ryan Jimmo (UFC, MFC)
 Fabio Mello (Bellator FC, Pride FC)
 Marcus Aurélio  (UFC, Pride FC)
 Jorge Santiago (UFC, Strikeforce, Sengoku)
 Siyar Bahadurzada (UFC, Sengoku, Shooto)
 Gesias Cavalcante (Strikeforce, Shooto, K-1)
 Guto Inocente (Strikeforce, UFC)
 Andrews Nakahara (K-1, DREAM)
 Braulio Estima (ADCC)
 Miguel Torres (UFC, WEC)
 Danillo Villefort (UFC, WEC, Strikeforce) 
 Yuri Villefort (UFC, Strikeforce)
 Abel Trujillo (UFC)
 Luiz Firmino (Pride FC, Shooto, DREAM)
 Claude Patrick (UFC, KOTC)
 Ryan LaFlare (UFC)
 Gilbert Burns (UFC, BJJ World Champion)
 Tom Niinimäki (UFC) 
 Volkan Oezdemir (UFC, SUPERKOMBAT, Bellator)
 Alistair Overeem (Strikeforce, Pride FC, DREAM, UFC) 
 Stefan Struve (UFC) 
 Hans Stringer (UFC, WSOF)
 Kamaru Usman (UFC) 
/ Beslan Isaev (M-1 Global and ACB) 
/ Musa Khamanaev (M-1 Global Lightweight Champion and Combat Sambo World Champion)

See also
List of Top Professional MMA Training Camps

References

External links

2011 establishments in Florida
Mixed martial arts training facilities
Kickboxing training facilities